Halichoeres timorensis, the Timor wrasse, is a species of salt water wrasse found in the Indo-West Pacific Ocean.

Size

References

timorensis
Taxa named by Pieter Bleeker
Fish described in 1852